New Princeton may refer to:

New Princeton, Ohio, an unincorporated community in Coshocton County
New Princeton, Oregon, an unincorporated community in Harney County